Microtest Health was a health informatics company founded in 1955 based in Bodmin, Cornwall, UK. The company was acquired by innovation venture capital investor, Public Group International in April 2020, and rebranded to Eva Health Technologies in September 2020.    It began selling prescribing software to GP practices in the 1980s.

Until April 2020, Chris Netherton is its managing director. It was nominated for the South West Digital Awards in 2018.

Its Open Evolution system is integrated with Servelec's RiO electronic patient record, which is used within mental health, community health and child health care settings. It plans further integration with its social care case management system, Mosaic.

It aims to implement the NHS Digital programme GP Connect.

England
Microtest Health produces one of the computer systems available to GPs in England under the Systems of Choice scheme from 2008.  

Once the most dominant primary care software in Devon and Cornwall, Microtest's Evolution software was replaced by EMIS Health's EMIS Web platform which now (2020) accounts for two thirds of all GP surgeries in Cornwall.  Microtest's contract with the Welsh NHS, taking the focus away from their customers in Cornwall has been cited as a major contributor to this shift for the previously very loyal customer base.

Wales
111 GP surgeries using EMIS Health in Wales moved to Microtest in June 2018. It is one of two companies awarded a four year contract by the NHS Wales Informatics Service. This contract was terminated in October 2019 after numerous delays, with a number of those GP surgeries moving back to EMIS Health.

See also
EMIS Health
SystmOne
VisionHealth

References

Electronic health record software companies
Companies based in Cornwall
Private providers of NHS services
Bodmin